Surrender Dorothy is the third album by Alana Davis. It was released in 2005 on Davis's own label, Tigress Records.

"Surrender Dorothy" is a line from the film The Wizard of Oz.

Track listing

References

2005 albums
Alana Davis albums
Rock albums by American artists